The 1940 East Tennessee State Teachers Buccaneers football team was an American football team that represented State Teachers College, Johnson City—now known as East Tennessee State University (ETSU)—as a member of the Smoky Mountain Conference during the 1940 college football season. Led by ninth-year head coach Gene McMurray, the Buccaneers compiled an overall record of  4–4 with a mark of 3–3 in conference play, placing third in the Smoky Mountain Conference. Bud Carpenter and Frank Parsely were named co-captains for the year. The team played  and  each twice, losing both games to Carson-Newman and splitting with Emory and Henry.

Schedule

References

East Tennessee State Teachers
East Tennessee State Buccaneers football seasons
East Tennessee State Teachers Buccaneers football